Bourgogne Pro Dialog was a French professional cycling team, which competed in elite road bicycle racing events such as the UCI Women's Road World Cup.

Major wins
2012
Stage 4 Women's Tour of New Zealand, Emma Crum

National champions
2013
 France Road Race, Élise Delzenne

References

Defunct cycling teams based in France
UCI Women's Teams
Cycling teams established in 2008
Cycling teams disestablished in 2013
2008 establishments in France
2013 disestablishments in France